The Waldorf Astoria Las Vegas, formerly the Mandarin Oriental, Las Vegas, is a 47-story luxury hotel and condominium building in the CityCenter complex on the Las Vegas Strip in Paradise, Nevada. It is managed by Hilton Worldwide as part of the Waldorf Astoria Hotels & Resorts brand. It is owned by Tiffany Lam and Andrew and Peggy Cherng.

The hotel was originally owned by MGM Mirage and Dubai World, and operated by Mandarin Oriental Hotel Group as part of its luxury chain. It opened on December 4, 2009, occupying the former site of the Boardwalk hotel-casino. It was rebranded under the Waldorf Astoria name in 2018, following a $214 million purchase by Lam and the Cherngs. The hotel has 389 rooms leading up to the lobby on the 23rd floor. The upper floors contain 225 condominium residences.

History
The property began as the Mandarin Oriental, Las Vegas. It was announced in September 2005, as part of MGM Mirage's CityCenter project. Mandarin Oriental Hotel Group (MOHG) would manage the hotel, which would be owned by MGM and partner Dubai World. The hotel was built at the southeastern corner of CityCenter, occupying the former site of the Boardwalk hotel-casino.

Mandarin Oriental, Las Vegas was designed by Kohn Pedersen Fox, with hotel interiors by Adam Tihany. The residential component was designed by Kay Lang and Associates. The hotel received a LEED Gold certification on November 20, 2009.

Mandarin Oriental, Las Vegas opened on December 4, 2009. It was the third component to open at CityCenter, following Vdara and Crystals. It was hoped that Mandarin Oriental, a well-known brand outside of the U.S., would help attract foreign visitors to CityCenter. The hotel offered a focus on personalized customer service, and it aimed to attract a high-end clientele. Mandarin Oriental also had the largest and most expensive condos at CityCenter, with an average listing price of $2 million.

Mandarin Oriental opened amid the Great Recession, and saw a disappointing financial performance during its first year, prompting increased marketing and promotions. MOHG viewed the property as a long-term investment.

In 2018, MGM and Dubai World sold the hotel for $214 million to hotel investor Tiffany Lam and Panda Express founders Andrew and Peggy Cherng. In conjunction with the sale, MOHG ceased managing the property on August 31, 2018, and Hilton assumed management, rebranding it as a Waldorf Astoria. The hotel's Asian theme would be removed during renovations.

Facilities
The Waldorf Astoria is 47 stories. It contains 389 hotel rooms and suites, and 225 condominiums, as well as a two-floor spa,  of meeting space, and a pool.

Hotel rooms occupy the first 22 floors. The hotel's  lobby, known upon opening as Sky Lobby, is located on the 23rd floor. At the time, the property was one of three Mandarin Oriental hotels in the world to include a Sky Lobby. The remaining floors are occupied by condos, with seven penthouses taking up the upper floors. The property has separate entrances for residents and hotel guests. Mandarin Oriental was among the most technologically advanced hotels in Las Vegas at the time of its opening. Rooms included a touch-screen device capable of ordering food service and controlling features such as lighting.

Mandarin Oriental opened along with Twist, a 74-seat French restaurant by chef Pierre Gagnaire, marking his U.S. debut. Located in the Sky Lobby, it included floor-to-ceiling views of the Strip. Lighting was provided by 300 golden globes, hung from the ceiling. The restaurant was designed by Tihany, and included a glass staircase leading to a wine loft. Other food and beverage amenities included a sushi and noodle bar, a high tea lounge, and a pastry shop.

In 2017, the Sky Lobby introduced a humanoid robot assistant named Pepper to greet guests and provide information.

Accolades
Within a year of opening, Mandarin Oriental received the AAA Five Diamond Award. In 2011, the spa was named by Forbes Travel Guide as a Five-Star recipient. Two years later, readers of Travel + Leisure named the Mandarin Oriental among the best hotels in Nevada. U.S. News & World Report, in its 2017 Best Hotels Rankings, also named it as the top hotel in Las Vegas.

Gallery

See also
 List of tallest buildings in Las Vegas

References

External links
 

2009 establishments in Nevada
Hotel buildings completed in 2009
Hotels established in 2009
Kohn Pedersen Fox buildings
Las Vegas Strip
Leadership in Energy and Environmental Design gold certified buildings
Residential buildings in the Las Vegas metropolitan area
Skyscraper hotels in Paradise, Nevada
Hilton Hotels & Resorts hotels